The Buried Self (German: Das begrabene Ich) is a 1921 German silent drama film directed by Léo Lasko and starring Frederic Zelnik and Wilhelm Diegelmann.

The film's sets were designed by the art director Fritz Lederer. Location shooting took place around Danzig.

Cast
 Frederic Zelnik
 Albert Patry
 Robert Scholz
 Lia Eibenschütz
 Fritz Schroeter
 Wilhelm Diegelmann
 Emmy Sturm
 Josef Commer
 Alexander Areuss
 Paul Passarge

References

Bibliography
 Bock, Hans-Michael & Bergfelder, Tim. The Concise CineGraph. Encyclopedia of German Cinema. Berghahn Books, 2009.

External links

1921 films
Films of the Weimar Republic
German silent feature films
Films directed by Léo Lasko
German black-and-white films
German drama films
1921 drama films
Silent drama films
1920s German films
1920s German-language films